The term "Hong Kong passport" can refer to the following passports which are used primarily by residents of Hong Kong:
 Contemporary passports
 British National (Overseas) passport, which is a type of British passport
 Hong Kong Special Administrative Region passport, a type of Chinese passport
 Defunct passport
 The passport for British Dependent Territories citizen Hong Kong passport, which is an older type of British passport